Bridge in Upper Frederick Township is a historic Pratt through Truss bridge located at Zieglerville in Upper Frederick Township, Montgomery County, Pennsylvania. The bridge was built in 1888, by the Phoenix Bridge Co of Phoenixville, Pennsylvania. It has a single  span.  The bridge crosses Swamp Creek.

It was listed on the National Register of Historic Places in 1988.

References 

Road bridges on the National Register of Historic Places in Pennsylvania
Bridges completed in 1888
Bridges in Montgomery County, Pennsylvania
National Register of Historic Places in Montgomery County, Pennsylvania
Upper Frederick Township, Montgomery County, Pennsylvania
Pratt truss bridges in the United States
Metal bridges in the United States